The Society of the Companions of the Holy Cross (SCHC) is an organization for Episcopal/Anglican women founded by Emily Malbone Morgan in 1884. SCHC has chapters across the United States and India. There also is a virtual chapter for members who don't live near a chapter or can't attend meetings. This chapter, known as the Far & Near Chapter, has members in the United States, Belize, Canada, Great Britain, India and Japan.

The Companions are headquartered in Byfield, Massachusetts. This site is the location of their historic retreat and conference center, Adelynrood Retreat and Conference Center.

Membership 
Members of The Companions are laity and clergy women from the Episcopal Church, the Evangelical Lutheran Church in America and the Moravian Church (both full communion partners of the Episcopal Church).

Notable members 
 Emily Malbone Morgan – Social and religious leader in the Episcopal Church in the United States who helped found the Society of the Companions of the Holy Cross as well as the Colonel Daniel Putnam Association
 Vida Dutton Scudder – American educator, writer, and welfare activist in the social gospel movement
 Madeleine L'Engle – American writer of fiction, non-fiction, poetry, and young adult fiction, whose works reflect both her Christian faith and her strong interest in modern science

Books 
Source: WorldCat
Letters to Her Companions by Emily Malbone Morgan from Project Canterbury

The Vocation of Companionship, by Joanna Bowen Gillespie

Hymnal of the Society of the Companions of the Holy Cross

"To bind together" : a brief history of the Society of the Companions of the Holy Cross by Miriam Usher Chrisman

Gift for an agonized world : women, men, and movements for social justice in the Episcopal Church, 1887-1919, by Pamela W. Darling

References

External links
Official site
Adelynrood Retreat and Conference Center
Manual of the Society of the Companions of the Holy Cross (1909)

Anglican organizations
Religious organizations established in 1884
Christian religious orders established in the 19th century
Anglican orders and communities